Stepan Mikhailovich Topal (18 January 1938 – 29 September 2018) was a Moldovan politician of Gagauz ancestry. From 1990 to 1994 he served as the only leader and President of the Gagauz Republic; after reunification with Moldova he served until 1995 as Governor (başkan) of Gagauzia.

Leader of Gagauzia's separatist movement

By training, Topal is a road engineer. He was an activist of the Communist Party of Moldova.

On 19 August 1990, ethnic Gagauz separatists proclaimed an autonomous republic in southern Moldova, around the city of Comrat, and called it the Gagauz Republic (Gagauz-Yeri in their language). In September 1990, individuals representing the mostly Slavic inhabitants of the Dniester River's east bank proclaimed a separate entity in Transnistria with a capital at Tiraspol.

In 1990, Topal became one of the leaders of the separatist movement in southern Moldova. On 31 October 1990, he was elected president of the Supreme Soviet of the self-proclaimed Gagauz Republic.

Although the Supreme Soviet of the Republic of Moldova immediately declared these proclamations invalid, elections took place in both separatist republics. On 1 December 1991, Topal was elected president of the Gagauz Republic (90% votes), and from 1991 to 1995 he headed the Supreme Soviet of the Gagauz Republic. That same month, Igor Smirnov was elected president of Transnistria.

Topal supported greater unity among the former Soviet republics.

He also self-declared as an "anti-Romanian".

Political activity after 1995

Gagauz autonomy was enshrined in the July 1994 Constitution of Moldova, in Article 111, which also provides for Transnistria's autonomy. Later, the Parliament of the Republic of Moldova adopted an even broader law, which confers a special autonomous status on Gagauzia as of 23 December 1994.

After Gagauzia's autonomy was accepted by the Moldovan Parliament, the first round of elections for the post of Governor of Gagauzia took place on 25 May 1995, together with elections for the region's Popular Assembly. None of the four candidates for the governorship (Gheorghe Tabunșcic, Mihail Kendighelean, Dumitru Croitor and Stepan Topal) won the votes needed to be elected in the first round. Topal had not even managed to advance to the second round.

From 1999 to 2002, Topal was the principal adviser to başkan Dumitru Croitor. In the 2001 Moldovan parliamentary election, Topal ran for a seat from Comrat on the lists of the Edinstvo electoral bloc, but the alliance won less than the 5% of the vote needed to secure parliamentary seats, so Topal was not elected. In 2002, he was one of the founders of the social-political movement Za Gagauziu! (For Gagauzia), formed in opposition to the ruling Communists.

When snap elections for Governor of Gagauzia were held again on 6 October 2002, Topal ran again. However, the results were declared invalid, as only 41.43% of voters took part. When the election was repeated two weeks later, the local electoral commission barred Topal from running, citing irregularities in his filing papers.

References

External links
 Background on Topal and Gagauz elections
 Information about previous Gagauzia Governors' races 

1938 births
Gagauz people
Gagauzia conflict
Anti-Romanian sentiment
Moldovan engineers
2018 deaths
People from Gagauzia
Moldovan MPs 1990–1994
Heads of state of former unrecognized countries